Sen Yan's Devotion is a 1924 British drama film directed and written by A.E. Coleby. Sessue Hayakawa, Tsuru Aoki, Fred Raynham, Jeff Barlow and Tom Coventry featured in the film.

Plot 
A servant of a Japanese prince works to get back important papers of the line of succession.

Cast
 Sessue Hayakawa as Sen Yan 
 Tsuru Aoki as Sen Yan's wife 
 Fred Raynham as Lutan Singh 
 Jeff Barlow as Prince Huo Sang  
 Fred Raynham as Lutan Singh 
 Tom Coventry as  Li Chang   
 Johnny Butt as O Ming 
 Henry Nicholls-Bates as Wung Li

References

External links 
 

1924 films
British silent feature films
British black-and-white films
British drama films
1924 drama films
1920s British films
Silent drama films